Kim Jun-ho (born on December 15, 1986) is a South Korean singer, who is mainly active in Japan and China, where he is more well known by his stage names JUNO and ZUNO. His younger fraternal twin brother is JYJ-member Junsu. In 2014 he changed his name to Kim Moo-young.

Career

Pre-debut
Kim Jun-ho started playing baseball in elementary school and was scouted by the professional South Korean team SK Wyverns during high school. He attended Dong-eui University in Busan but dropped out during his freshman year due to a sports injury, which also ended his career as a professional baseball player.

2010-12: Debut in China and Japan, acting debut
In 2010, after having studied acting for two years and having spent a year at Beijing Normal University, Kim made his singing debut in China as ZUNO.

A year later, the singer debuted in Japan with his single album Fate as JUNO. The second single album Believe placed third on the Oricon daily chart and became the theme song for a Japanese Bee TV drama. Kim's third single Everything entered the Oricon Charts in second place and reached number ten on the weekly charts.

In 2012, Kim made his acting debut in the Korean drama Stroke of Luck.

Kim Jun-ho is currently a member of the South Korean all star football team FC MEN.

Discography

Albums

EPs

Soundtrack contributions
2012: "Look At Me" - Stroke of Luck OST (TV Chosun drama)

As featured artist
2011: Ayumi Hamasaki feat. Juno - "Why..." (from Five)

Music videos

DVDs

Songwriting credits

Filmography

Films

Television series

Variety shows

Music video appearances
 2012: Toko Furuuchi - "時間を止めて" (Romaji: Jikan wo Tomete, English: Stop Time) (from Yume no Tsuzuki)

Endorsement
 2009: Food Sixty

Notes

References

External links
  

1987 births
Korean Mandopop singers
South Korean J-pop singers
Living people
South Korean male television actors
People from Gyeonggi Province
South Korean twins
21st-century South Korean male singers